Tartuffe is a 1664 comedy play by Molière.

Tartuffe may also refer to:
 Tartuffe (1926 film), a German silent film
 Tartuffe (1965 film), an Australian television film
 Le tartuffe, a 1984 French comedy film
 Tartuffe (Mechem), a 1980 opera by Kirke Mechem